Minerva  was launched in 1791 at Galway. She then traded widely, particularly as a West Indiaman. Between 1800 and 1804 she made two voyages from Bristol as a Guineaman. That is, she was a slave ship, carrying enslaved peoples in the Trans-Atlantic slave trade. She then returned to trading with the West Indies. A United States privateer captured her in 1814.

Career
Minerva first appeared in Lloyd's Register (LR) in 1792.

Although the voyage data in Lloyd's Register does not indicate it, Minerva next made two voyages as a slave ship. 

1st slave voyage (1800–1802): Captain John Kennedy acquired a letter of marque on 9 April 1800. He sailed from Bristol on 5 May. Minerva acquired her slaves on the Windward Coast. She delivered her slaves to Demerara and then sailed on to Grenada. Apparently she landed some 223 slaves in all. She returned to Bristol on 27 January 1802.

2nd slave voyage (1802–1804): Captain Joseph (or John) Silcock sailed from Bristol on 5 December 1802 bound for the Gold Coast. Minerva started acquiring slaves on 31 January 1803. On 13 May 1803 Lloyd's List (LL) reported that Minerva, Silcock, master, had arrived at Africa. The same report mentioned that , Coley master, had also arrived there.

Minerva, Silcock, master, sailed to the leeward and returned to the Cape Coast Castle on 23 February. She again sailed to leeward on 5 November. She arrived at Demerara on 25 February and there landed 218 slaves. Advertisements described the slaves as being "Chantee" (Ashantee?), Coromantee, and Fantee. The agents for the sale were Walcott & Forrester and the sale was to begin on 2 March. Minerva arrived back at Bristol on 6 August.

Lloyd's Register continued to carry Minerva with unchanged information to 1813. However, the Register of Shipping carried two Minervas from 1809, one launched in 1791 at Galway with Bishop, master and owner, and trade London–West Indies, and a second, launched in 1791 in Ireland, with Williams, master, Anderson, owner, and trade London–Barbados.

The Register of Shipping carried both vessels 10 1813 with unchanged information.

Fate
Neither register carried Minerva in 1814.

On 8 January 1814 the United States privateer Comet captured a vessel, believed to be Minerva, of London. Minerva was close to Barbados when she was captured. 

Although Lloyd's Register carried 109 vessels named Minerva, only the Minerva of this article had London–Barbados as its trade. Also, no other Minerva showed a trade of London–West Indies.

Notes, citations, and references
Notes

Citations

References
 

1791 ships
Age of Sail merchant ships of England
Bristol slave ships